The Fear Street Trilogy is an American horror film series, with varying subgenres of horror, particularly the slasher and supernatural subgenres. Directed by Leigh Janiak from scripts and stories she co-wrote with other contributors, the films are based on R. L. Stine's book series of the same name. The overall story revolves around teenagers who work to break the curse that has been over their town for hundreds of years. Produced and developed by 20th Century Studios and Chernin Entertainment, the film's distribution rights were eventually acquired by Netflix following The Walt Disney Company's purchase of 21st Century Fox.

The three films were shot back-to-back, and were released on a weekly basis as Netflix Original Films in July 2021 to positive reviews. More films from the trilogy are planned.

Development
In October 1997, Hollywood Pictures struck a deal to acquire the Fear Street series of books, which were set to be developed with Parachute Entertainment as a Scream-like feature franchise. Developments never materialized.

In October 2015, a film based on Stine's Fear Street series was being developed by 20th Century Fox and Chernin Entertainment. On February 13, 2017, The Tracking Board reported that Kyle Killen would write the script for the film. In July, the adaptation was announced as a trilogy, with Leigh Janiak directing, and rewriting the script with her partner Phil Graziadei. Zak Olkewicz was also drafting a script. The films were to be shot back to back, with the intention of releasing them to theaters one month apart. Janiak describes the format as a "hybrid of traditional television content and movies," with each installment intended to both have a satisfying ending and connecting to the larger story.

The series was reported to be centered around a young lesbian couple, navigating their rocky relationship when they are targeted by crazy horrors in their small town. In March 2019, filming began in Atlanta and East Point, Georgia, with some parts filmed at Hard Labor Creek State Park in Rutledge in August 2019. The shoot lasted for 106 days, wrapping in September 2019.

In April 2020, Chernin Entertainment ended their distribution deal with 20th Century Studios and made a multi-year first-look deal with Netflix, resulting in the latter distributing the trilogy.

Films

Fear Street Part One: 1994

After a series of brutal slayings, a group of teenagers take on an evil force that's plagued their notorious town for centuries.

The film was released on July 2, 2021. Janiak describes it as influenced by 1990s slasher films, especially Scream.

Fear Street Part Two: 1978

In the cursed town of Shadyside, a killer's murder spree terrorizes Camp Nightwing and turns a summer of fun into a gruesome fight for survival.

The film was released on July 9, 2021. Janiak states that she was influenced by Friday the 13th.

Fear Street Part Three: 1666

Thrust back to 1666, Deena learns the truth about Sarah Fier. Back in 1994, the friends fight for their lives — and Shadyside’s future.

The film was released on July 16, 2021. Janiak compares it to The New World.

Future
In July 2021, director Leigh Janiak expressed interest in expanding the film series beyond the trilogy of movies. She had stated to be interested in adapting a slasher film that takes place during the 1950s and centers on Harry Rooker / The Milkman. Cast members similarly expressed interest in returning.

In July 2022, Stine stated that there are discussions ongoing for additional films being developed in the series. Later that month, Bloody Disgusting confirmed this statement with Netflix, stating that official plans would be announced in the future.

Characters

Release
The first film was scheduled to be released theatrically in June 2020, but was pulled from the schedule because of the COVID-19 pandemic. In April 2020, Chernin Entertainment ended their distribution deal with 20th Century Studios and made a multi-year first-look deal with Netflix. By August 2020, Netflix had acquired the distribution rights to the Fear Street trilogy. The films were released exclusively as Netflix Original Films.

In May 2021, the official trailer released by Netflix announced the respective films' credits, release dates, and official titles, as: Fear Street: Part One - 1994, Fear Street: Part Two - 1978, and Fear Street: Part Three - 1666. The trilogy of films is R-rated, with original novel series writer R.L. Stine praising the direction and adaptations of his books.

The films were released over a three week span: July 2, July 9, and July 16.

Additional crew and production details

Reception

Critical and public response

Accolades

See also
 Fear Street (book series) by R.L. Stine

References 

Film series introduced in 2021
Fear Street
Horror film series